Lise Gregory and Ronni Reis were the defending champions but did not compete that year.

Patty Fendick and Jill Hetherington won in the final 6–4, 6–2 against Gigi Fernández and Robin White.

Seeds
Champion seeds are indicated in bold text while text in italics indicates the round in which those seeds were eliminated.

 Gigi Fernández /  Robin White (final)
 Patty Fendick /  Jill Hetherington (champions)
 Jenny Byrne /  Janine Tremelling (quarterfinals)
 Manon Bollegraf /  Mercedes Paz (quarterfinals)

Draw

References
 1988 Honda Classic Doubles Draw

Puerto Rico Open (tennis)
1988 WTA Tour